Psychotria hobdyi, the milolii kopiwai, Hobdy's wild-coffee or kopiko, is a species of plant in the family Rubiaceae. It is endemic to the Hawaiian Islands, where it is known only from the island of Kauai. There are about 10 populations for a total of about 120 individuals. It is threatened by habitat loss and was federally listed as an endangered species of the United States in 2010.

References

Endemic flora of Hawaii
Trees of Hawaii
hobdyi
Plants described in 1977
Endangered plants
Taxonomy articles created by Polbot